Yekaterina Alexandrovna Babshuk (born 18 September 1991) is a Kazakhstani footballer who plays as a midfielder and has appeared for the Kazakhstan women's national team.

Career
Babshuk has been capped for the Kazakhstan national team, appearing for the team during the 2019 FIFA Women's World Cup qualifying cycle.

References

External links
 
 
 

1991 births
Living people
Sportspeople from Kokshetau
Kazakhstani women's footballers
Kazakhstan women's international footballers
Women's association football midfielders
BIIK Kazygurt players
Kazakhstani people of Russian descent